East Lyme High School is a 9-12 high school in the Flanders Village region of East Lyme, Connecticut, United States. The school serves students from the towns of East Lyme and Salem, Connecticut. It is operated by East Lyme Public Schools. East Lyme High School has been open since 1967.

Salem Schools Co-op Agreement

Since East Lyme High School's founding in 1967, students from the neighboring town of Salem have attended East Lyme High School from grades 9 through 12, due to Salem lacking a high school of their own. In 1997, East Lyme High School was formally recognized as the official high school of Salem Public Schools after an official agreement was established between the two towns. In 2016, a new co-op agreement between East Lyme and Salem was adopted such that Salem students can continue to attend East Lyme High School through June 2039.

Notable alumni

 Evan R. Bernstein, community leader
 John McDonald, professional baseball player
 Jay Allen Sanford, author and cartoonist
 Ed Toth, professional musician
 Pete Walker, professional baseball player

References

External links
 
 2016 co-op agreement between Salem and East Lyme

East Lyme, Connecticut
Salem, Connecticut
Schools in New London County, Connecticut
Public high schools in Connecticut
1967 establishments in Connecticut